Johnny Young (born 1947), Australian singer and TV personality

Johnny Young may also refer to:

 Johnny "Man" Young (1918–1974), American blues singer, mandolin player and guitarist
 Johnny Young (diplomat) (1940–2021), former United States Foreign Service officer and ambassador
 Johnny Young (politician) (1931–1990), businessperson and political figure on Prince Edward Island

See also
 John Young (disambiguation)
 Jonathan Young (disambiguation)